Eduard Vladimirovich Topol, real name Topelberg (born 8 October 1938) is a Russian writer, film producer and screenwriter.

Biography
Born in Baku, Topol spent his teenage years finishing local school in Baku and graduated from Azerbaijan State Economic University. He also did his military service in Estonia. He worked as journalist for newspapers such as Bakinskiy Rabochiy and Komsomolskaya Pravda and wrote the screenplays for seven movies, of which two were banned due to censorship under the Soviet government.

In 1978 he emigrated to USA, New York City, and lived for short periods in Boston, Toronto and Miami.

Personal life
He married twice and has one daughter and one son.

Bibliography
Russian
 Red Square
 Submarine U-137
 Journalist for Brezhnev
 Strange Face
 Tomorrow in Russia
 Red Snow
English
 Dermo!: The Real Russian Tolstoy Never Used (A book on Russian language)

See also
 The Pyramid. The Soviet Mafia

References 

Journalists from Baku
Soviet Jews
Russian Jews
Russian male novelists
1938 births
Living people
Film people from Baku
Azerbaijan State University of Economics alumni